The CNT-F (Confédération nationale du travail) or National Confederation of Labour is a French anarcho-syndicalist union.

It was founded in 1946 by Spanish anarcho-syndicalists in exile, and former members of Confédération Générale du Travail-Syndicaliste Révolutionnaire (CGT-SR), its name is derived from the Spanish CNT, the Confederación Nacional del Trabajo.

Division 

Nowadays, two French organisations share the name CNT:

 the CNT-Vignoles (or CNT-f), from the name of the street where their main office in Paris is located. It contains the most members of the two organisations.

They decline the term anarchist, preferring to call themselves "revolutionary unionist" (syndicalistes révolutionnaires).
They accept the terms of the 1906 Charter of Amiens, the Charter of Lyon (1926) and the charter of Paris (1946).

They also accept participation in the professional elections and collaboration with others unions.

 the CNT-AIT. This is the French section of the International Workers' Association (IWA).
They define themselves as anarchosyndicalist, while they have clear influences from council communism, worker anarchism of the Federación Obrera Regional Argentina (FORA) and the Situationist International.

See also 

Anarchism in France
Confederación Nacional del Trabajo (CNT), its Spanish sister trade union
Confederacion General del Trabajo de España (CGT), Spanish anarchosyndicalist trade union
Étienne Roda-Gil, songwriter and screenwriter
Léo Ferré, songwriter
Confédération générale du travail unitaire, French trade union (1921–1936)

References

External links

 CNT-Vignoles Homepage
 CNT-AIT

Syndicalism
Trade unions in France
International Workers' Association
Trade unions established in 1946
Far-left politics in France
Anarchist organizations in France
Anarchist organizations in Europe
National trade union centers of France
Revolutionary Syndicalism
Syndicalist trade unions